This is a list of cancelled games for the Atari Lynx.

List 
There are currently  games on this list.

See also 
 List of Atari Lynx games
 Lists of video games

Notes

References 

Atari Lynx